Robert Collins (born 18 April 1924) is a British retired rower who competed in the 1948 Summer Olympics.

References

1924 births
Living people
British male rowers
Olympic rowers of Great Britain
Rowers at the 1948 Summer Olympics
Place of birth missing (living people)